Naci Yenier (born February 10, 1965) is a Turkish Paralympian archer competing in the Men's compound bow W1 event.

Early life
Naci Yenier was born on February 10, 1965. He lives in Istanbul, Turkey.

Sporting career
Yenier began his archery career in 2012, and debuted internationally in 2015. He has been coached by Hasan Cenk Öz since 2014.

He obtained a quota for the 2016 Summer Paralympics,5. Games in Rio de Janeiro, Brazil.

He was the world champion breaking the  world record twice in 2017 and 
2019 with his team.

He was in the 3rd place in European Championship in 2018.Beside They were in the 1st place as W1 team .

References

1965 births
People from Ceyhan
Turkish male archers
Paralympic archers of Turkey
Wheelchair category Paralympic competitors
Archers at the 2016 Summer Paralympics
Living people
21st-century Turkish people